Streptanthus carinatus, the lyreleaf jewelflower, is an annual to biennial plant in the mustard family (Brassicaceae) found in the Arizona Upland of the Sonoran Desert.  Subspecies S. carinatus arizonicus has white to cream colored flowers in its western range, becoming strongly yellow eastward. Subspecies S. carinatus carinatus has purple flowers.

References

carinatus
Plants described in 1853